Ōkawa, Okawa, Ookawa or Ohkawa (written: 大川 literally "big river") is a Japanese surname. Notable people with the surname include:

, Japanese fencer
Hisayuki Okawa (born 1971), athlete
Misao Okawa (1898–2015), Japanese supercentenarian
Nanase Ohkawa (born 1967), Japanese manga writer
Ryuho Okawa (born 1956), religious and political leader
Shūmei Ōkawa (1886–1957), Japanese nationalist, Pan-Asian writer, indicted war criminal, and Islamic scholar
Tōru Ōkawa (born 1960), Japanese actor
, Japanese AV idol

Japanese-language surnames